Ayusazovo (Ayıwhaź) is a rural locality (a village) in Tashbulatovsky Selsoviet, Abzelilovsky District, Bashkortostan, Russia. The population was 205 as of 2010. There are 6 streets.

Geography 
Ayusazovo is located 52 km northeast of Askarovo (the district's administrative centre) by road. Tashbulatovo is the nearest rural locality.

References 

Rural localities in Abzelilovsky District